Jamal Fountaine (born January 29, 1971) is a former NFL defensive end.

High school
Fountain attended Lincoln High School in San Francisco, California where he ran track and played basketball, playing football beginning in his junior year.

Collegiate career
Fountaine played defensive end for the Washington Huskies and was a starter for the 1992 and 1993 seasons and letterman from 1990 to 1993.

In 1989, he was awarded the team's Mark Drennan Memorial Award as special teams scout squad MVP, also later awarded to his younger brother Matt Fountaine in 2002.
He played in the Rose Bowl as a member of 1990, 1991, and 1992 teams.  He finished his career as a team captain during the 1993 season, which concluded with the 1994 Hula Bowl.

Fountaine earned a construction engineering degree at Washington.

NFL career
He was not selected in the 1994 NFL Draft, but signed as a free agent with the San Francisco 49ers where he spent two seasons including their 1995 Super Bowl team. He later was a member of the Carolina Panthers and Atlanta Falcons.

Post NFL Career
Fountaine became a graduate assistant at Washington in 2002 and then joined Portland State in 2003.
In 2008, Fountaine became a firefighter for the Alameda County Fire Department.

References

External links
 

Washington Huskies football players
San Francisco 49ers players
Carolina Panthers players
Atlanta Falcons players
1971 births
Living people
American football defensive ends